Michael Johnston (born February 22, 1996) is an American actor. He is best known for his role as Corey Bryant in the MTV series Teen Wolf and for his starring role in the indie film Slash. He is also a voice actor for animation and video games.

Early life
Johnston was born on February 22, 1996. He grew up in Rutherfordton, North Carolina where at the age of 12 he started auditioning for voice-overs in commercials and animation in a recording studio he had set up in his bedroom. After graduating from R-S Central High School early, he moved to Chicago where he studied acting at The Second City. He was only in Chicago for six months before moving to Los Angeles.

Career

Voice acting
Johnston has voiced characters for video games, including Dust: An Elysian Tail, Tales of Zestiria and Kingdom Hearts III and TV shows, such as Nagi-Asu: A Lull in the Sea, Tales of Zestiria the X and Zak Storm.

Film and television
Johnston appeared in Awkward and played Corey Bryant, a recurring character in the final two seasons of Teen Wolf.

Johnston had the lead role in the comedy film Slash, where he played Neil, a 15-year-old high school student who writes slash fiction. He also appeared in the indie horror film Bornless Ones.

Filmography

Film

Television

Video games

References

External links

1996 births
Living people
American male television actors
American male video game actors
Place of birth missing (living people)
American male voice actors
21st-century American male actors